Muyun is a subdistrict of Tianxin District in Changsha, Hunan province, China. It contains 11 administrative villages and two communities, with the government based in Muyun Community.

Subdistricts of Changsha
Divisions of Tianxin District